Y Glog or Draws Drum is a mountain in Ceredigion, Wales. It is 574 metres (1883 feet) above sea level and is located a few miles south of Pumlumon, north of Pen y Garn and just south of the A44 road. It is a HuMP.  It is located in an area of bleak moorland with the Cefn Croes Wind Farm and the small lakes Llynoedd Ieuan nearby.

Mountains and hills of Ceredigion